Archivos de Medicina Veterinaria is a peer-reviewed scientific journal published by the Faculty of Veterinary Sciences of the Universidad Austral de Chile (Austral University of Chile). It covers research on a wide range of veterinary medicine and animal welfare topics.

Abstracting and indexing 
The journal is abstracted and indexed in the Science Citation Index Expanded, Current Contents/Agriculture, Biology and Environmental Sciences, and Biological Abstracts.

References

External links 
 

Veterinary medicine journals
Mass media in Valdivia
Austral University of Chile academic journals
Publications established in 1969
Multilingual journals
Triannual journals
Agriculture in Chile
1969 establishments in Chile